The U.S. Department of Agriculture South Building is an office building located at 14th Street and Independence Avenue, Southwest, Washington, D.C.

History
It was built beginning in 1930, to house the expanded offices of the United States Department of Agriculture (USDA). Construction was completed on the U.S. Department of Agriculture Administration Building to the north of Independence Avenue in 1930, but Depression-era agriculture programs demanded far more office space than the main building could provide. The phased construction was completed in 1936. The building was added to the National Register of Historic Places in 2007.

The building's design is credited to Louis A. Simon of the Federal Office of the Supervising Architect. The South Building was joined to the Administration Building by two enclosed pedestrian bridges spanning Independence Avenue, thus consolidating USDA operations into one complex. The new building contained laboratory space as well as offices. It was originally referred to as the "Extensible Building", which could be expanded in a phased fashion. Phasing was necessary due to the time required to acquire such a large parcel of land.

The architecture of the South Building is a stripped-down example of Classicism, with plain detailing that borrows from Classical form and proportion without using a great deal of expensive and time-consuming detail. The style became popular for government buildings until the advent of the Modern style in government architecture, reaching its apex at the Pentagon. In the case of the South Building, the lesser level of detail indicated its subordinate position vis-à-vis the Administration Building. The interior is based on a rigidly-enforced network of corridors; only the departmental auditorium and library deviate from the corridor grid. Interiors are even more plain than the exterior.

The building is arranged in seven north-south wings, connected at the ends by the Headhouse (facing Independence Avenue) and Tailhouse (facing C Street). The 12th and 14th Street elevations were planned to be seen from the National Mall and so were sheathed in limestone. The C Street and Independence Avenue elevations, which are not visible from the National Mall, used brick as the primary material, with limestone and terra cotta detailing. The 14th Street elevation also features a monumental entrance with sixteen Corinthian columns. Elsewhere, relief panels between windows feature depictions of animals native to the United States by sculptor Edwin Morris.

Since the relocation of laboratory space to the Beltsville Agricultural Research Center, the South Building has been occupied exclusively by offices.

See also
 National Register of Historic Places listings in the District of Columbia
 Southwest Federal Center, Washington, D.C.
 U.S. Department of Agriculture Cotton Annex

References

External links

 Agriculture South Building at the General Services Administration
 History of the Washington USDA complex with links to construction pictures

Government buildings completed in 1936
Department of Agriculture South Building
Department of Agriculture South Building
Department of Agriculture South Building
Department of Agriculture South Building
Department of Agriculture South Building
South Building